Ben Norris may refer to:

 Ben Norris (artist), (1910–2006), American modernist painter
 Ben Norris (actor), British playwright and actor
 Ben Norris (comedian), British stand-up comic